Aizada Muptilda (born 23 April 1998) is a Kazakhstani weightlifter. She won the gold medal in the women's +87kg event at the 2021 Islamic Solidarity Games held in Konya, Turkey. She also won the gold medal in her event at the 2022 Asian Weightlifting Championships held in Manama, Bahrain.

She competed in the women's +87kg event at the 2018 World Weightlifting Championships held in Ashgabat, Turkmenistan. She also competed in the women's +87kg event at the 2021 World Weightlifting Championships held in Tashkent, Uzbekistan.

References

External links 
 

Living people
1998 births
Place of birth missing (living people)
Kazakhstani female weightlifters
21st-century Kazakhstani women